The Raleigh mayoral election of 2001 was held on November 6, 2001, to elect a Mayor of Raleigh, North Carolina. The election was non-partisan. It was won by Charles Meeker, who defeated incumbent Paul Coble in the run-off. A third candidate was eliminated in the first round on October 9.

Results

References

2001
Raleigh
2001 North Carolina elections
November 2001 events in the United States